Zhelnino is a rural locality (a village) in Posyolok Nikologory, Vyaznikovsky District, Vladimir Oblast, Russia. The population was 23 as of 2010.

Geography 
Zhelnino is located 26 km southwest of Vyazniki (the district's administrative centre) by road. Ivankovo is the nearest rural locality.

References 

Rural localities in Vyaznikovsky District